Fifty Classic Climbs of North America is a climbing guidebook and history written by Steve Roper and Allen Steck. It is considered a classic piece of climbing literature, known to many climbers as simply "The Book", and has served as an inspiration for more recent climbing books, such as Mark Kroese's Fifty Favorite Climbs. Though much of the book's contents are now out of date, it is still recognized as a definitive text which goes beyond the traditional guidebook.

History

The first edition was published in 1979, by Sierra Club Books in the United States and in Great Britain by the now-defunct Diadem Books.  This was followed by a paperback printing by Random House in 1981.  Two subsequent editions (with the same content) were published by Sierra Club Books in 1982 and 1996.  Between 1979 and 1999 it sold nearly thirty thousand copies, a considerable achievement for a climbing guide book.

Reviewing the book in American Alpine Journal, Fred Beckey wrote: "Roper and Steck have presented a profile of what could be considered the Great American Dream climbs with a writing style that provides much Lebensraum for speculation and meditation. While reading, one is tempted to meditate: the challenge of the alpine adventure is always there; the dreams of the various pioneers sometimes filter through the narrative."

Roper and Steck received the American Alpine Club's 1995 Literary Award for the book and for their other works such as The Best of Ascent.

To choose the list of climbs, the coauthors solicited opinions from a number of leading climbers of the era, narrowing a list of more than 100 climbs according to three basic criteria: that the peak or route appear striking from afar, have a noteworthy climbing history, and offer climbing of excellent quality. Precedence was given to climbing quality over appearance and appearance over historical significance. In order to judge the historical significance and continuing popularity, routes were limited for the most part to those first ascended before 1970. A lower limit on the length of the route, at 500 feet, was also established. Steck and Roper had personally ascended or attempted most of the selected routes.

The list of fifty climbs has served as a challenge to climbers, providing them with a "tick list" of challenging routes that span a wide section of western North America. Author Steve Roper has emphasized that the climbs were chosen from a list of about 120 climbs he and Steck considered classic, and are simply '50 classic climbs', not 'the 50 classics'. Nevertheless, the book brought great popularity to many of the routes it featured, and prospective climbers pursuing one of the "fifty classics" often found crowds on the more accessible climbs and unexpected company on the more remote routes, earning them the nickname "Fifty Crowded Climbs".

No one person has yet climbed all fifty routes. This has been attributed to the difficulty of some of the Alaskan and Canadian routes (the Hummingbird Ridge of Mount Logan has never been repeated by the original route).

Fifty Classics 
The fifty climbs included in the book are listed below, along with their grades as given in the first edition, which may differ from those found in a modern guidebook due to changes in climbing standards or route conditions.

Alaska and the Yukon

Western Canada

The Pacific Northwest

Wyoming

Colorado

Utah & New Mexico

California

References 

Climbing books
Mountaineering books
1979 non-fiction books